Sunray Independent School District is a public school district based in Sunray, Texas (USA).  Located in Moore County, the district extends into a portion of Sherman County.

In 2009, the school district was rated "recognized" by the Texas Education Agency.

Schools
Sunray High School
Sunray Middle School
Sunray Elementary School

References

External links
Sunray ISD

School districts in Moore County, Texas
School districts in Sherman County, Texas